Louňovice pod Blaníkem is a market town in Benešov District in the Central Bohemian Region of the Czech Republic. It has about 700 inhabitants.

Administrative parts
Villages of Býkovice, Mrkvová Lhota, Rejkovice and Světlá are administrative parts of Louňovice pod Blaníkem.

Geography
It lies in the Vlašim Uplands. The Blanice River flows through the municipal territory. The entire territory lies within the Blaník Protected Landscape Area.

History
The first written mention of Louňovice is from 1149, when there was founded a women's Premonstratensian monastery. In 1420, the monastery was burned down by the Hussites. From 1436 to 1547, Louňovice was property of the town of Tábor. The then-owner of Louňovice Oldřich Skuhrovský had built a Renassaince fortress in the second half of the 16th century. From 1672 until the 20th century, Louňovice was owned by the archbishopric of Prague.

Sights
The Louňovice pod Blaníkem Castle is located on the town square. The former fortress was extended into the current castle in 1652. Today it houses the tourist infocentre and a museum.

The second landmark of Louňovice pod Blaníkem is the Church of the Assumption of the Virgin Mary. It is a Baroque building with a Gothic core.

The most popular tourist destination is the mountain Velký Blaník with an observation tower on its top. On the top of Malý Blaník is a ruin of the Chapel of Saint Mary Magdalene.

Notable people
Jan Dismas Zelenka (1679–1745), Baroque composer and musician
Petr Borkovec (born 1970), poet, translator and journalist

References

External links

Populated places in Benešov District
Market towns in the Czech Republic